Robert Hugh Leathem (c. 1925 – July 7, 1996) was a Canadian football player who played for the Calgary Stampeders. He won the Grey Cup with the Stampeders in 1948.

References

Year of birth missing
Calgary Stampeders players
1996 deaths